"S.R. 819" is the ninth episode of the sixth season of the science fiction television series The X-Files. It premiered on the Fox network on January 17, 1999, in the United States. The episode was written by John Shiban, and directed by Daniel Sackheim. The episode helps to explore the series' overarching mythology. "S.R. 819" earned a Nielsen household rating of 9.1, being watched by 15.7 million people in its initial broadcast. The episode received mixed to positive reviews from critics.

The show centers on Federal Bureau of Investigation (FBI) special agents Fox Mulder (David Duchovny) and Dana Scully (Gillian Anderson) who work on cases linked to the paranormal, called X-Files. Mulder is a believer in the paranormal, while the skeptical Scully has been assigned to debunk his work. In the episode, Mulder and Scully have 24 hours to save Assistant Director Skinner (Mitch Pileggi) from a biologically engineered disease. In order to combat the disease, Scully looks for a medical answer, while Mulder searches for the culprits behind the attack on Skinner's life. To aid him in this task, Mulder visits Senator Matheson, whom he hopes can help him find who is responsible before time runs out.

Before the writing of "S.R. 819", the writers for The X-Files felt that the character of Walter Skinner was becoming too "expendable". John Shiban, the writer of the episode, decided to re-work Skinner back into the series' mythology by crafting the episode around him. Mitch Pileggi had to endure long bouts of make-up application, a process that he admitted he "hated". The nanobots in the blood sample were designed on a computer and then rendered for the final footage.

Plot
The episode opens with Assistant Director Walter Skinner (Mitch Pileggi) unwell and horribly discolored in hospital. His veins are a sickly purple hue and are pulsating ominously. Suddenly, he goes into cardiac arrest and the doctors pronounce him dead.

Twenty-four hours earlier, Skinner loses a boxing match after experiencing a dizzy spell. While at the hospital, he receives a call on his cell phone from a computerized voice telling him that he has only twenty-four hours to live.  He is discharged from the hospital but Fox Mulder (David Duchovny) and Dana Scully (Gillian Anderson) witness a bruise on his ribs growing. After trawling through security footage from the entrance to the J. Edgar Hoover Building, Scully recognizes a physicist named Dr. Kenneth Orgel, who advises a Senate subcommittee on ethics and new technology, and who stopped Skinner in the hall that same morning. Mulder and Skinner travel to Orgel's house but find he is being held hostage. Mulder apprehends one of the kidnappers, who does not speak English. They release him since he has papers showing diplomatic immunity.

Mulder does a background check on the kidnapper, which leads him to Senator Richard Matheson (Raymond J. Barry); this results in a dead end, however. Scully discovers Skinner's blood sample and, after checking, she finds that Skinner's blood contains some sort of multiplying carbon nanotechnology. Meanwhile, Skinner ends up in hospital following a gunfight in the FBI parking garage. Mulder and Scully reunite at the hospital, where Mulder tells Scully that Skinner was investigating a health funding bill called S.R. 819. Mulder chases a suspicious bearded man, who sent a threatening message to Skinner's phone but escapes. Talking to Scully, Skinner remembers seeing the bearded man at the boxing club, the FBI and the hospital.

Meanwhile, Senator Matheson arrives at an old power plant where Orgel is kept and suffers from the same condition afflicting Skinner. Before Matheson can free him, Orgel dies as the bearded man maximizes the nanotechnological effects via some remote control. Later, Mulder also arrives at the power plant and confronts Matheson. At the hospital, Skinner goes into cardiac arrest but suddenly revives when the bearded man deactivates his remote control.

Later, Mulder and Scully report to Skinner, who is back in good health and claims not to recognize the bearded man. Skinner closes the case, ordering the agents to report exclusively to Assistant Director Alvin Kersh. In the final scene, the bearded man appears in Skinner's car and is revealed to have been a disguised Alex Krycek (Nicholas Lea), a rogue FBI agent who formerly worked for the Syndicate, and who continues to control the potentially debilitating nanotechnology in Skinner's body.

Production

Writing
At the start of season six, the producers of The X-Files began to worry that Walter Skinner was becoming "expendable", as Mulder and Scully's transfer from the X-Files division meant that they saw less and less of him. Originally, John Shiban, the writer of the episode, wanted to infect Mulder with nanobots. However, he decided that since the audience knew Mulder would not be killed, this plot would not be very effective. Shiban thus decided to re-work Skinner back into the series mythology by putting him in Mulder's place. Shiban, inspired by the noir film D.O.A. (1950) and its 1988 remake—which he jokingly called "[two] pretty bad movies"—decided to craft an episode of The X-Files around the concept of "a guy who's been poisoned [and] has only a short time to live and has to use that time to find out why and by whom he's being murdered".

Shiban began crafting his story by incorporating a nanobot plot that had been considered by various writers for several seasons. Shiban and the rest of the writing room were conscious in their decision to give Alex Krycek full control over Skinner via the nanobot infection, as it caused Skinner to once again become a mysterious character whose true loyalties could be tested. Shiban noted that, "[Krycek's control] gives Skinner an agenda that Mulder doesn't know about [...] Which was something we ultimately used again in the seasonender , and will carry us into next year".

Filming and effects
Originally, the episode was slated to feature a "time-consuming" fight scene pitting Skinner against Krycek, but the scene was cut because of time-constraints and worries about going over-budget. However, Skinner's boxing match proved much "eas[ier] to stage". Mitch Pileggi had boxed competitively in college and went for "refresher course[s]" at the Goosen Gym in Los Angeles to prep for the episode. He later remarked, "It makes me happy that some people will assume there was a stunt double in the ring. There wasn't! [...] We both had a pretty good time". Location manager Ilt Jones called "S.R. 819" the "damn parking lot episode" because he was personally tasked with finding the variety of parking lots used in the episode. He later joked, "I started to wake up screaming about barriers and parking tickets and entrances and exit ramps".

Pileggi had to endure long hours of makeup application, and to create the principal illusion of monstrous veins, long black faux-veins were glued to his body. Pileggi had had little to no makeup in previous episodes and later said, "They did a beautiful job and [the veins] looked awesome, but man, I hated it! I really don't know how those guys on Star Trek or Babylon 5 can stand having that done to them every day. I just wouldn't work if that's what it took". To show the nanobot infection progressing, special effects makeup supervisor John Vulich used two different makeup sets: one representing the early stage of the disease, and the other representing the later stage. The nanobots in the blood sample were designed on a computer and then cloned with an animation program.

Broadcast and reception
"S.R. 819" first aired in the United States on January 17, 1999. This episode earned a Nielsen rating of 9.1, meaning that roughly 9.1 percent of all television-equipped households were tuned in to the episode. It was viewed by 15.7 million viewers. The episode aired in the United Kingdom and Ireland on Sky1 on May 2, 1999, and received 690,000 viewers, making it the second most watched episode that week. Fox promoted the episode with the tagline "He has 24 hours to solve his own murder... or die." The episode was nominated for three 2000 Emmy Awards by the Academy of Television Arts & Sciences for Outstanding Music Composition for a Series (Dramatic Underscore). The episode was later included on The X-Files Mythology, Volume 3 – Colonization, a DVD collection that contains episodes involved with the alien Colonist's plans to take over the earth.

The episode was met with mixed to positive reviews from critics. Tom Kessenich, in his book Examination: An Unauthorized Look at Seasons 6–9 of the X-Files wrote positively of the episode, saying, "'S.R. 819' re-established some wonderful conspiracy overtones and perhaps set the stage for more interesting developments in the future. It touched base with the very roots The X-Files sprung out of and did so in strong fashion." Emily VanDerWerff of The A.V. Club gave the episode a moderately positive review and awarded it a "B". She enjoyed the plot, calling it "fun", praised the twist ending, and called the nanobot makeup effects "legitimately terrifying". She did, however, write critically of Skinner's role in the episode, noting that his lack of presence made the entry a "disappointing one". In addition, VanDerWerff criticized the fact that the teaser shows Skinner dying; she wrote that "[t]here’s very little gas in the idea of Skinner dying" and that most of the viewers knew he would not die.

Paula Vitaris from Cinefantastique gave the episode a mixed review and awarded it two stars out of four. Vitaris cited severe problems with "Skinner's emotional journey" as the main detractors for the episode. Robert Shearman and Lars Pearson, on the other hand, awarded the episode two out of five stars in their book Wanting to Believe: A Critical Guide to The X-Files, Millennium & The Lone Gunmen. The two, despite writing positively of the "traditional X-File" feel, called the episode "a return to the sort of murky storylining which promises so much but delivers so little".

Footnotes

Bibliography

External links 

 

1999 American television episodes
The X-Files (season 6) episodes
Television episodes directed by Daniel Sackheim
Television episodes set in Maryland